Shaozhou Tuhua (traditional: 韶州土話; simplified: 韶州土话 Sháozhōu Tǔhuà "Shaoguan Tuhua"), or simply Tuhua, is an unclassified Chinese variety spoken in the northern region of Guangdong and Guangxi provinces, China. It is mutually unintelligible with Xiang, Cantonese, and Mandarin.

Classification
Some scholars consider it to be an extension of Ping Chinese (Pinghua) in Guangxi. Others consider it to have a foundation in Song dynasty-era Middle Gan, mixed with Hakka, Cantonese, and Southwestern Mandarin.

Chen (2012) notes that the Shaoguan Tuhua of Shibei (石陂, in Zhenjiang District) shares many similarities with the Hakka of Qujiang District, due to intensive contact.

Dialects
Shaozhou Tuhua is also known as Yuebei Tuhua (粤北土话, "Northern Guangxi/Guangdong Tuhua"), and as Shīpóhuà (虱婆话,  "Shipo dialect"), Shīnǎhuà (虱乸话, "Shina dialect"), or  Shīpóshēng (虱婆声, "Shipo accent") in its own region. It is also known as Pingdi Yaohua (平地瑶话, "Lowland Yao dialect"), locally Piongtuojo or Piongtoajeu; "Yao" here might be a cultural designation, as only half of the one million speakers are classified as ethnic Yao.

Li & Zhuang (2009) cover the following dialects of Shaoguan Tuhua.
Dacun (大村), Qujiang District
Xiangyang (向阳), Wujiang District
Shibei (石陂), Zhenjiang District
Zhoutian (周田), Renhua County
Shitang (石塘), Renhua County
Guitou (桂头), Ruyuan County

Zhang Shuangqing (2004) covers five dialects of Lianzhou Tuhua.
Xingzi (星子) dialect: 120,000 speakers in Xingzi (星子), Qingjiang (清江), Shantang (山塘), Tanling (潭岭), Dalubian (大路边) towns, and parts of Mabu (麻步) and Yao'an (瑶安) towns
Bao'an (保安) dialect: 30,000 speakers in Bao'an Town (保安镇), and parts of Longping Town (龙坪镇)
Lianzhou (连州) dialect (locally called ᴀt24 pi55 sheng 声): 40,000 speakers in Lianzhou Town (连州镇) and Fucheng Town (附城镇)
Xi'an (西岸) dialect (locally called Mansheng 蛮声): 30,000 speakers in Xi'an Town (西岸镇)
Fengyang (丰阳) dialect (locally called Mansheng 蛮声): 50,000 speakers in Fengyang Town (丰阳镇), and parts of Zhugang (朱岗), Dongpo (东陂), and Yao'an (瑶安) towns

Distribution
Tuhua is retreating before Cantonese and Hakka and is found in rural dialect islands in the northern Guangdong counties of Lechang, Renhua, Ruyuan Yao Autonomous County, Qujiang, Nanxiong, Zhenjiang, Wujiang (parts of Shaoguan prefecture-level city), and Lianzhou and Liannan Yao Autonomous County in Qingyuan prefecture-level city.

See also
Lingling dialect
Maojia dialect

References

External links
Classification of Tuhua Dialects
Divergent Chinese dialects database (Academia Sinica)

Chinese-based pidgins and creoles
Guangdong
Guangxi